The Benwood Mine Disaster was a coal mine explosion that occurred on Monday, April 28, 1924, at the Benwood Mine of the former Wheeling Steel Corporation steel mill located in the city of Benwood in Marshall County, West Virginia.  The explosion claimed the lives of 119 coal miners.  There were no survivors.  It is the third worst coal mining disaster in the state of West Virginia after the Monongah Mine disaster of December 6, 1907 that claimed the lives of 361 miners and the Eccles Mine Disaster of April 28, 1914 that claimed the lives of 183 miners.  

The explosion, caused by the ignition of methane gas and coal dust, occurred at approximately 7:05 AM EST, about a half-hour after the morning shift of coal miners had entered the mine to begin work.

The majority of the miners killed were recent European immigrants of the early 20th Century from Poland, Italy, Greece, Hungary, Croatia, Serbia, Russia, Ukraine, Lithuania, Slovakia, England, Wales and Scotland.

A memorial for the 119 victims of the April 28, 1924 Benwood Mine Disaster was erected at the mouth of Boggs Run along Boggs Run Road/Roosevelt Avenue in Benwood, Marshall County, West Virginia in 2014.  A committee of eight Marshall County, West Virginia residents known as the Benwood Mine Disaster Memorial Committee was formed in August 2011. Fundraising for the memorial began in 2012. Construction took place between 2013 and 2014. The memorial was formally dedicated on September 27, 2014. A smaller memorial for the five victims of the May 18, 1942 Hitchman Coal & Coke Mine Disaster (this coal mine was also located in Benwood) is also on site and was dedicated on the same day.

On September 2, 2019, a memorial was dedicated at the Benwood Mine Disaster Memorial Site honoring Joseph "Joe" Tellitocci, Jr. (December 31, 1952 - March 15, 2018), who served as the Project Coordinator of the Benwood Mine Disaster Memorial Committee from 2011 until his death in 2018 and was a former Benwood City Councilman from 1982 to 2002.  He and his oldest son, Joseph Anthony "Joey" Tellitocci (who served as the Co-Chairman, Treasurer and Historian of the Benwood Mine Disaster Memorial Committee), were both honored as West Virginia History Heroes in 2015 at the West Virginia State Capitol in Charleston, West Virginia for their efforts in establishing the memorial.

References

External links
Benwood Mine Disaster Historical Marker

Coal mining disasters in West Virginia
Marshall County, West Virginia
1924 disasters in the United States
1924 in West Virginia
1924 mining disasters
April 1924 events